The Killing Tree (sometimes abbreviated as TKT) were a hardcore punk band from Chicago, Illinois. They were a side project of Tim McIlrath during the early days of Rise Against and featured former Rise Against guitarist Todd Mohney and bassist Geoff Reu of Baxter and Holy Roman Empire.

Career
The Killing Tree was formed shortly after Tim McIlrath's other band, Rise Against, in 1999. The band's main line-up consisted of McIlrath on guitar and vocals, Reu on bass and backing vocals, Mohney on guitar, and Remis on drums.

In an interview, Tim McIlrath told the interviewer "I used to play in a band called Baxter with Geoff Reu and Remis, and we always had an itch to do heavier music. After Baxter broke up we would have sporadic, impromptu jam sessions in my basement for a year, with no real intention of starting anything. We actually had a female roommate at the time singing for us for a while! Either way, the songs began to take shape and we realized we needed someone else to complete the chaos, so we enlisted Todd to shred with us, and all the pieces fell into place. After we completed a number of songs we realized that what started out as fun we thought might actually go over well.
"

McIlrath was concerned that Rise Against's record label, Fat Wreck Chords would not want him recording with a different band, so all members of The Killing Tree used false identities when performing and recording. In February 2003, the band signed to Eyeball Records, who released the band's We Sing Sin EP in May 2003. The Killing Tree has not had any albums or EPs released since 2003.

The Killing Tree has not performed live since 2004 or released any new music since 2006, and the official website has not been updated since August 26, 2006.

In an Interview with Punknews.org Tim McIlrath was asked about The Killing Tree's future and said:
"I would love to. I would love to right now. I'd love to call those guys and just fucking write a record right now if we could. I think Neil is getting back from Europe today and I'm going to hang out with him later tonight. Todd is out of LA right now doing a bunch of graphic design stuff and Geoff is doing Holy Roman and also doing his masters degree at UIC. For me and Neil to actually have lunch together though, that's like the stars are aligned. It's a fucking miracle. I would love to and I think that I still love the Killing Tree and what we've created. I love the record, it was a lot of fun. But, there's no real mystery to why we're not doing records- it's simply because there's no time. If there was, we'd all be having a lot of fun and writing some new songs or at least playing some shows. But who knows, we tend to do a show every year or so in Chicago somewhere.."

Musical style
The Killing Tree's musical style is typified by longer songs and more prominent metalcore and Swedish death metal influences, such as screaming vocals and aggressive breakdowns, than that of McIlrath's other band, Rise Against. Although the vocals are primarily screamed, many tracks alternate between screaming and clean vocals. The lyrics tend to be darker and have violent themes. They have been described as metalcore, hardcore punk and post-hardcore, with their style having been compared to acts such as AFI, At the Drive-In and Sparta.

Discography
Studio albums
 The Romance of Helen Trent (2002)

EPs
 Bury Me at Make-Out Creek (2000)
 We Sing Sin (2003)

Compilations
 Hair: Chicago Punk Cuts ("Dressed to Fuck" only) (2006)

Members
 Tim McIlrath (James Kaspar) - lead vocals, rhythm guitar (1999-2006)
 Todd Mohney (Todd Rundgren) - lead guitar (1999-2006)
 Geoff Reu (Jean-Luc Rue) - bass, backing vocals (1999-2006)
 Timothy Remis (Botchy Vasquez) - drums (2000-2006)

Previous members
 Laura Cahill - co-lead vocals (1999) 
 Neil Hennessy - drums (1999)

Other appearances
 Emily Schambra (of Holy Roman Empire) - guest vocals on "Dressed To Fuck"

References

External links
Punknews.com Profile
The Killing Tree Website (Archived)
The Killing Tree Website Interview

Musical groups from Chicago
Musical groups established in 1999
Metalcore musical groups from Illinois
American post-hardcore musical groups
Musical quartets
Musical groups disestablished in 2006
1999 establishments in Illinois